Worcestershire County Council elections are held every four years. Worcestershire County Council is the upper-tier local authority for the non-metropolitan county of Worcestershire in England. Since the last boundary changes in 2005, 57 councillors have been elected from 52 electoral divisions.

Political control
Worcestershire County Council was first established in 1889 under the Local Government Act 1888. The county council was abolished in 1974, with the area merging with neighbouring Herefordshire to become a new non-metropolitan county called Hereford and Worcester, with Hereford and Worcester County Council serving as the higher-tier authority of the new county. Hereford and Worcester was abolished 24 years later and split back into separate counties of Herefordshire and Worcestershire, with Worcestershire County Council being re-established in 1998. The first elections to the re-established Worcesteshire County Council were held in 1997, initially operating as a shadow authority until the new arrangements came into effect on 1 April 1998. Political control of the council since 1998 has been held by the following parties:

Leadership
The leaders of the council since 1998 have been:

Council elections
1997 Worcestershire County Council election
2001 Worcestershire County Council election
2005 Worcestershire County Council election (new division boundaries)
2009 Worcestershire County Council election
2013 Worcestershire County Council election
2017 Worcestershire County Council election
2021 Worcestershire County Council election

County result maps

By-election results

See also 
 Hereford and Worcester County Council elections

References

External links 
 County Council Elections.  Worcestershire County Council.

 
Politics of Worcestershire
Council elections in Worcestershire
County council elections in England